In the mathematical field of graph theory, a graph  is symmetric (or arc-transitive) if, given any two pairs of adjacent vertices  and  of , there is an automorphism

such that

 and 

In other words, a graph is symmetric if its automorphism group acts transitively on ordered pairs of adjacent vertices (that is, upon edges considered as having a direction). Such a graph is sometimes also called -transitive or flag-transitive.

By definition (ignoring  and ), a symmetric graph without isolated vertices must also be vertex-transitive. Since the definition above maps one edge to another, a symmetric graph must also be edge-transitive. Star graphs are a simple example of being edge-transitive without being vertex-transitive or symmetric. As a further example, semi-symmetric graphs are edge-transitive and regular, but not vertex-transitive. 

Every connected symmetric graph must thus be both vertex-transitive and edge-transitive, and the converse is true for graphs of odd degree.  However, for even degree, there exist connected graphs which are vertex-transitive and edge-transitive, but not symmetric.  Such graphs are called half-transitive. The smallest connected half-transitive graph is Holt's graph, with degree 4 and 27 vertices. Confusingly, some authors use the term "symmetric graph" to mean a graph which is vertex-transitive and edge-transitive, rather than an arc-transitive graph. Such a definition would include half-transitive graphs, which are excluded under the definition above.

A distance-transitive graph is one where instead of considering pairs of adjacent vertices (i.e. vertices a distance of 1 apart), the definition covers two pairs of vertices, each the same distance apart. Such graphs are automatically symmetric, by definition.

A  is defined to be a sequence of  vertices, such that any two consecutive vertices in the sequence are adjacent, and with any repeated vertices being more than 2 steps apart.

Examples

Two basic families of symmetric graphs for any number of vertices are the cycle graphs (of degree 2) and the complete graphs. Further symmetric graphs are formed by the vertices and edges of the regular and quasiregular polyhedra: the cube, octahedron, icosahedron, dodecahedron, cuboctahedron, and icosidodecahedron. Extension of the cube to n dimensions gives the hypercube graphs (with 2n vertices and degree n). Similarly extension of the octahedron to n dimensions gives the graphs of the cross-polytopes, this family of graphs (with 2n vertices and degree 2n-2) are sometimes referred to as the cocktail party graphs - they are complete graphs with a set of edges making a perfect matching removed. Additional families of symmetric graphs with an even number of vertices 2n, are the evenly split complete bipartite graphs Kn,n and the crown graphs on 2n vertices. Many other symmetric graphs can be classified as circulant graphs (but not all).

The Rado graph forms an example of a symmetric graph with infinitely many vertices and infinite degree

Cubic Symmetric graphs
Combining the symmetry condition with the restriction that graphs be cubic (i.e. all vertices have degree 3) yields quite a strong condition, and such graphs are rare enough to be listed. They all have an even number of vertices.  The Foster census and its extensions provide such lists. The Foster census was begun in the 1930s by Ronald M. Foster while he was employed by Bell Labs, and in 1988 (when Foster was 92) the then current Foster census (listing all cubic symmetric graphs up to 512 vertices) was published in book form.  The first thirteen items in the list are cubic symmetric graphs with up to 30 vertices (ten of these are also distance-transitive; the exceptions are as indicated):

Other well known cubic symmetric graphs are the Dyck graph, the Foster graph and the Biggs–Smith graph.  The ten distance-transitive graphs listed above, together with the Foster graph and the Biggs–Smith graph, are the only cubic distance-transitive graphs.

Properties 
The vertex-connectivity of a symmetric graph is always equal to the degree d. In contrast, for vertex-transitive graphs in general, the vertex-connectivity is bounded below by 2(d + 1)/3.

A t-transitive graph of degree 3 or more has girth at least 2(t – 1).  However, there are no finite t-transitive graphs of degree 3 or more for t ≥ 8.  In the case of the degree being exactly 3 (cubic symmetric graphs), there are none for t ≥ 6.

See also
Algebraic graph theory
Gallery of named graphs
Regular map

References

External links
Cubic symmetric graphs (The Foster Census). Data files for all cubic symmetric graphs up to 768 vertices, and some cubic graphs with up to 1000 vertices. Gordon Royle, updated February 2001, retrieved 2009-04-18.
Trivalent (cubic) symmetric graphs on up to 10000 vertices. Marston Conder, 2011.

Algebraic graph theory
Graph families
Regular graphs